Pseudocophotis sumatrana is a species of agamid lizard. It is endemic to Indonesia.

References

Pseudocophotis
Reptiles of Indonesia
Reptiles described in 1879
Taxa named by Ambrosius Hubrecht
Fauna of Sumatra
Fauna of Java